Eleocharis sundaica is a sedge of the family Cyperaceae that is native to Australia.

It blooms between May and August producing white flowers.

It is found in and around swamps and pools of water in the Kimberley region of Western Australia where it grows in sandy soils.

References

Plants described in 1958
Flora of Western Australia
sundaica
Taxa named by Johannes Hendrikus Kern